Alfredo Bruniera (30 September 1906 – 26 March 2000) was an Italian prelate of the Catholic Church who spent his career in the diplomatic service of the Holy See.

Biography
Alfredo Bruniera was born in San Pelagio, Italy, on 30 September 1906 and studied at the seminary in Treviso. He was ordained a priest of the Diocese of Treviso by Giacinto Longhin on 9 July 1933. He did parish work until February 1934 when he became secretary to the newly appointed Apostolic Delegate to China Mario Zanin. He later worked in the nunciatures in Chile and Argentina.

On 12 December 1954, Pope Pius XII appointed him a titular archbishop and Apostolic Delegate to the Belgian Congo. He received his episcopal consecration on 2 January 1955 from Cardinal Celso Costantini.

On 25 April 1959, Pope John XXIII named him Apostolic Nuncio to Ecuador.

On 23 October 1965, he was appointed Apostolic Nuncio to Uruguay by Pope Paul VI.

On 23 April 1969, he was appointed Apostolic Nuncio to Lebanon. To that was added the responsibilities of the Apostolic Pro-Nuncio to Kuwait on 7 July 1969; he was the first to head that nunciature. He was replaced in Kuwait by Jean Rupp on 4 March 1975.

His service as nuncio ended when he was appointed Vice President of the Pontifical Council Cor Unum by Pope John Paul II on 6 November 1978. He retired from the Council upon the appointment of his successor, on 10 December 1981.

He died on 26 March 2000.

References

External links
Catholic Hierarchy: Archbishop Alfredo Bruniera 

1906 births
2000 deaths
Apostolic Nuncios to the Democratic Republic of the Congo
Apostolic Nuncios to Ecuador
Apostolic Nuncios to Uruguay
Apostolic Nuncios to Lebanon
Apostolic Nuncios to Kuwait
People from Duino-Aurisina